Kiss the Pig is the seventh album by Today Is the Day, released on June 29, 2004 through Relapse Records. Lyrically, the album takes inspiration from the presidency of George W. Bush and the Iraq War. Steve Austin wrote most of the album after a live performance the band played with Slayer in Japan. The same show is where the group met Japanese charcoal artist Takanami Kazuhiko, whose painting titled Evileyes was chosen for the album's cover before recording even began.

The album's title is supposed to be a reference to Austin's critique of capitalism and American society, and was inspired by how "all of us, from the day we are born are taught to love and worship money, even though money is the ruin of mankind."

Track listing

Accolades

Personnel 
Adapted from the Kiss the Pig liner notes.

Today Is the Day
Steve Austin – vocals, guitar, sampler, production, engineering
Chris Debari – bass guitar, backing vocals
Mike Rosswog – drums

Production
Aaron Kotilainen – assistant engineering
Dave Wilson – assistant engineering

Release history

References

External links 
 
 Kiss the Pig at Bandcamp

2004 albums
Relapse Records albums
Today Is the Day albums